Wiatrak may refer to:

Wiatrak, Warmian-Masurian Voivodeship, a village in Bartoszyce County, Warmian-Masurian Voivodeship, Poland

People with the surname
Bill Wiatrak, American actor
John Wiatrak (1913–2000), American football player